The second RMS St. Patrick was a steam packet ferry of the St George Steam Packet Company which served entirely in Ireland, running from Cork to Waterford. She was ordered in 1825 following the selling of the first St. Patrick the previous year. She continued serving the company until 1831, when she grounded with no loss of life. She was launched on 19 August 1825 in Liverpool with a tonnage of 203 or 300 depending on the source (mentioned in infobox). She measured  in length by

Loss 
On 24 November 1831, the St. Patrick grounded on a sand bar in thick fog off Hook Tower in Waterford at the end of her voyage. There were no casualties, and she was not commanded by her normal captain on her fateful voyage. An unnamed newspaper said:

Following the disaster, the wreck was not refloated or even salvaged, but a new ship by the same name was ordered. Divers in 1989 reported finding pieces of brass on the seabed in - of water around 52°9' N, 6°55' W. Although this is close to where the vessel is reported to have sunk, many ships have also been lost in that area. Her replacement RMS St. Patrick also sank nearby seven years later.

References

1825 ships
Steamships of the United Kingdom
Maritime incidents in November 1831
Shipwrecks of Ireland